The 2015 Gran Prix San Luis Femenino was the third edition of a one-day women's cycle race held in Argentina on January 10, 2015. The race had a UCI rating of 1.2.

Teams
UCI Women's Teams

Club teams

Acimproba–Orbai
Argentino–Mixto
Bianchi–Peugeot
Bontrager
Brunetta Bike
Coach–Yaco
Funvic
Latinoamericano–Ray
Neuquin
Stemax Sports

National teams

Brazil
Colombia
Cuba
Italy

Results

See also
 2015 in women's road cycling

References

2015 in women's road cycling
Sport in San Luis Province